Holy Name of Jesus Cathedral is a Catholic cathedral that is the seat of the Diocese of Raleigh, replacing Sacred Heart Cathedral.

The cathedral accommodates more than 2,000 worshippers and serves as the site for major liturgical celebrations, pilgrimages, and events for the Catholic community of eastern North Carolina. The existing Sacred Heart Cathedral will be retained and honored as the first church designated to be the cathedral for the Diocese of Raleigh but will be renamed Sacred Heart Church.

Holy Name of Jesus Cathedral was designed by the architecture firm of O'Brien & Keane, based in Arlington, Virginia, and built by Clancy & Theys Construction Company of Raleigh, North Carolina. It is the fifth-largest cathedral in the United States.

History 

In 1899, Fr. Thomas F. Price and his sister, Sr. Mary Agnes of the Sisters of Mercy, founded a Catholic orphanage on a large property of land that Price had purchased in his own name adjacent to the city of Raleigh. The orphanage, serving primary and secondary school aged children, initially was an all-boys institution, but later also served girls. In the early 1950s, Bishop Vincent Waters decreed that all racial discrimination in Catholic parishes and institutions in the Diocese of Raleigh cease, so the high school students at the Nazareth Orphanage were transferred to Cathedral Latin High School at Sacred Heart Cathedral. Two years later the Nazareth Orphanage's elementary school closed.

In the 1960s, Cathedral Latin High School was the only Catholic high school in Raleigh, and was not large enough to accommodate the growing population of Catholics. Bishop Waters built a new high school, Cardinal Gibbons High School, on a portion of the former Nazareth Orphanage site. The school was moved in the late 1990s to its current location after a request was made by Bishop F. Joseph Gossman.

The Nazareth Property housed the Diocese of Raleigh Catholic Center, which serves as the headquarters for the bishop and administrative staff of the diocese, until 2014 when it was moved to a building off of Creedmoor Road.

In 2011, Bishop Michael F. Burbidge announced the construction of a new cathedral to replace the existing Sacred Heart Cathedral, due to the need for a larger church to accommodate the growing number of Catholics. Fundraising for the cathedral campaign began in September 2011. Groundbreaking for the cathedral took place on January 3, 2015. The construction of the cathedral cost $46 million. The cathedral was dedicated on July 26, 2017.

Description 
Holy Name of Jesus Cathedral is arranged in a cruciform layout and has a gross floor area of approximately 43,000 square feet. The main axis of the building is placed in an east–west orientation, with the entrance to the west. This is in keeping with Catholic tradition and reflects the spirituality of Catholicism in Sacred Scripture (Mt 2:1-2, Mt 24:27, Lk 13:29, Rev 16:12). The sanctuary—including the altar of sacrifice, ambo, and cathedra—is located under the dome, while the tabernacle is placed within the eastern apse. Seating for the congregation, illuminated by clerestory windows, is located within the nave and transepts and is separated from the side aisles by an arcade. A mezzanine, located above and to the west of the nave, is provided to accommodate choir, organ and musicians. The transition from the sacred spaces to the surrounding grounds is bridged by a tall narthex, from which one may also access the Chapel of All Saints. Outside of the main entrance is a public plaza to allow vehicles to approach the cathedral and circulate out to parking areas, as well as to serve as a gathering place for those visiting the cathedral.

Exterior

Chapel 
The chapel's primary function in the cathedral is to provide a quiet space for reflection and adoration of the Blessed Sacrament. As such, the architecture presents an elevated design and incorporates the Corinthian Order. Its exterior is rendered completely in cast stone, to distinguish it from the rest of the building and denote its importance.

The chapel windows are also from the Church of the Ascension in Philadelphia, and were designed by JM Kase & Company Art Stained Glass. There are a total of seven windows in the chapel; four depicting the Evangelists, two decorative windows, and one round window depicting an angel.

Cornerstone 

In December 2015, Bishop Michael F. Burbidge, then bishop of the Diocese of Raleigh, presented Pope Francis with the cornerstone for the Holy Name of Jesus Cathedral. Pope Francis blessed the cornerstone for the cathedral, assuring Bishop Burbidge and the Diocese of Raleigh of his prayers.

It was designed by the architect and is made of Santafiora stone. It is inscribed with the image of a Christogram, the ancient emblem of the name of Jesus, and represents the dedication of the cathedral. The Christogram, along with the inscription of the year 2017, are rendered in gold.

The cornerstone was installed on July 21, 2017, five days before the dedication of the new cathedral.

Dome 

The stature of Holy Name of Jesus Cathedral is architecturally conveyed by the inclusion of a prominent dome, the significance of which was described by the architect:

The 162-ton copper-clad ribbed dome was constructed on the ground and lifted into place via crane in a remarkable feat by the contractor. A decorative finial and a cross embellish the top of the dome, which reaches to a total height of 173 feet above the ground. The drum of the dome, adorned with a range of paired Corinthian columns and entablature and sixteen arched windows, is located directly above the sanctuary platform below it.

The dome is composed of an inner and outer shell, with a cavity between them. This space provides access to the top of the dome through the interstitial space, for access to the engineering systems. The interior of the dome exhibits many of the same characteristics as its exterior, including Corinthian pilasters and ribs. The interior height of the dome reaches 137 feet above the floor below.

Materials 
The façade of the cathedral is predominantly wood-mold brick, yielding a soft impression to the masonry. The brick was specified in a "rose" color, with a high degree of color range intended to lend visual interest to the building's exterior. This material and color recalls the region's architectural heritage, as do the grapevine mortar joints. Cast stone, specified in a range of colors, is incorporated into the most prominent parts of the building, such as the West entry façade and the exterior of the chapel. The roof surfaces are clad in copper.

Nave and transept walls 
The exterior walls of the Nave and Transepts feature paired arched windows at the floor level, arranged in a total of 22 bays, with single arched windows centered above the pairs in the clerestory of each bay. In a simplified expression of the interior architectural language, the masonry features corbelling (intentional, minor projections in the brickwork) to lend relief and interest to the surface of the structure through shadow, and to enhance the design details, articulating the bays and conveying the building's structural strategy on its exterior. The voussoirs forming the arches are custom-made tapered shapes, in order to allow the joints to remain parallel, and to relieve the workmen of the laborious and dangerous task of saw-cutting brick on-site.

The stained glass windows are in part salvaged from the church "Ascension of Our Lord" in Philadelphia, PA, where ten large windows were flanked by two smaller ones. In the cathedral design, these two smaller windows remain grouped with their respective larger windows, but are simply placed at the ground level instead of the clerestory level, thereby relating to their original arrangement. The salvaged windows were designed by Paula Balano and restored by Beyer Studios in Philadelphia, PA. Beyer Studios also designed additional windows for the cathedral, which are placed in an alternating pattern with the salvaged stained-glass windows throughout the Nave and Transepts. The newly fabricated windows feature the same border design as the original windows, but include translucent glass fields instead of biblical scenes as depicted by the Balano windows. The diamond-patterned window fields reference the diamond motif that is repeated throughout the cathedral, including the glass in many of the interior doors and in the lighting fixtures. This pattern also references the Diocese of Raleigh's coat of arms, which incorporates seven diamonds.

Tower 

The bell tower reaches to a height of 154 feet and contains a 50-bell carillon. The bells range in size from 18 pounds to nearly a ton. Forty-nine of the bells were fabricated by Verdin Bells & Clocks. One bell was salvaged from the original Holy Name of Jesus Chapel which once stood on the same property as the cathedral. They were blessed by Bishop Burbidge in November 2016 and were installed the week of April 17, 2017. A cross with a decorative flag tops the tower, which also includes a decorative balustrade, engaged Corinthian columns and moldings, rustication of the brickwork, and quoins along the tower's corners.

Five of these bells have been inscribed with the mottos of the five bishops of the diocese of Raleigh.

The inscriptions are:
"Emitte Spiritum Tuum" (Send forth thy spirit) - Most Reverend William J. Hafey, First Bishop of Raleigh

"Omnia Omnibus" (All things to all men, from 1 Corinthians 9:22) - Most Reverend Eugene J. McGuinness, Second Bishop of Raleigh

"Omnia Per Mariam" (All through Mary) - Most Reverend Vincent S. Waters, Third Bishop of Raleigh

"To serve, not be served" - Most Reverend F. Joseph Gossman, Fourth Bishop of Raleigh

"Walk humbly with God" - Most Reverend Michael F. Burbidge, Fifth Bishop of Raleigh

Transept ends 
The brickwork, cast stone piers, parapet, and window surrounds of the Transept ends relate visually the entry façade in composition, but are rendered in a simplified design expression, without the Doric or Ionic features visible at the entrance of the building.

West (Entry) Façade 
The design for the entry announces the design theme for the building and introduces classical orders: the Doric order, in the tradition of classical Roman architectural design, constitutes the first tier of the façade, while the Ionic order fills the second tier. A field of brick above the cast stone entry is punctuated by a 12-foot diameter round window, framed with cast stone. Cast stone piers and an entablature that tend toward a Romanesque design expression bound the composition.

Interior

Chapel 
The Chapel of All Saints, which is intended to serve as a place of quiet reflection and Adoration of the Blessed Sacrament, is embedded into the main cathedral building with its windows facing south and is entered from the narthex. The chapel seats forty congregants, and features marble liturgical furnishings that relate to those in the main sanctuary. The Chapel Tabernacle, much like the Main Tabernacle, is designed as a miniature, idealized version of the chapel. The architect designed the tabernacle so that its façade appears as he imagined the front of the chapel itself might have been, had it not been conjoined with the main building. For example, the tabernacle displays a detached range of Corinthian columns, as seen on the exterior of the actual chapel, as well as a hip roof.

The Tabernacle and altar are both rendered in Bianco Carrara C marble with Giallo Sienna marble accents. The altar is inscribed with the Alpha-Omega symbol, again representing the Book of Revelation, where these letters are used to represent Christ as the "beginning and the end."

Choir loft and mezzanine 
The mezzanine, including the choir loft and organ, is approximately 3500 square feet. The choir loft seats approximately 60 people including seating for 30 instrumental musicians. The loft features risers for the choir as well as a platform for the seated musicians and space for a piano.

One of the most impressive furnishings in size and scale, the pipe organ (Opus 147) was designed and built by CB Fisk and features 61 stops. According to Fisk, "the organ's tonal design, developed with the requirements of the Roman Catholic liturgies in mind, is largely, but not exclusively, influenced by the English Romantic organs."   The organ was installed in the Fall of 2018.

Endo Narthex 
The Endo-Narthex, located between the Narthex and the Nave, is the site of the confessionals. The design for the four stained-oak confessionals was inspired by a traditional precedent seen in Italy by Bishop Michael Burbidge, updated to accommodate modern norms.

Narthex 
The design theme for the narthex was inspired by the courtyards of antiquity, featuring the classical orders of Doric and Ionic, and a barrel vault. In this transition space from indoors to outdoors, the narthex, similar to an open atrium, is expanded to allow the congregants to gather and greet one another prior to Mass, a preference voiced by parishioners. The architect commented that "the design will be similar to other Cathedrals, in that we are building on a 2000-year heritage of sacred architecture. At the same time, the Cathedral is intended to be a reflection of the values of the faithful of North Carolina, and so it is bound to be unique in that way."

Nave and transepts 
The interior of the nave and transepts repeats the articulation and rhythm of the exterior, providing further continuity in the architecture. The Classical orders of Doric and Ionic on the exterior walls, as described above, are recalled once more on the interior of the aisle arcade and triforium. Colossal piers superimposed over these two tiers support the ribs of the barrel vault. The apex of the barrel vault above reaches 77'-10" above the floor.

The nave and transepts seat 2,000 congregants; each transept seats 500 people and the nave welcomes 1,000 people. The layout intentionally allows for the pews to be proximate to the altar, thereby enhancing the sense of connection and access between the assembly and the sanctuary.

The perimeter of the interior is generously appointed with liturgical artwork. The ends of the transepts house shrines to Our Lady of the Immaculate Conception and St. Joseph the Worker, and feature carved statues rendered in lifelike tones. The side aisles also contain twenty-four similar statues of selected saints, including one niche that stands in reserve for Reverend Thomas Price, Servant of God, the first native-born North Carolinian to be ordained a Catholic priest. His Cause for Beatification and Canonization is currently under review in Rome. The fourteen Stations of the Cross seen throughout the Nave and Transept aisles are restored, painted wood, of a similar vintage as the windows.

The baptismal font is located at the western end of the Nave, on the axis of symmetry. The basin of the font measures 6 feet in diameter, and the element was designed by the architect and fabricated along with the balance of the liturgical furnishings. It is solid Bianco Carrara C marble and stands atop an octagonal marble flooring pattern of Bardiglio Nuvolato, arranged so that the natural veins of the marble appears to radiate from the font, representing the flow of water.

Sanctuary 
Below the dome, the Sanctuary platform houses the vital liturgical furnishings, with the Altar of Sacrifice as the focal element. All of the liturgical furnishings, which were designed by the architect, are rendered in Bianco Carrara C marble, with Giallo Siena marble accents on the pilasters and panels. The design of the altar incorporates elements of the Ionic order, and the other furnishings, including the Cathedra, Ambo, and Altar Rail, relate with a consistent design language.

The sanctuary flooring features Bardiglio Nuvolato marble slabs with diamond accents of Bianco Carrara C. The principal elements of Altar, Ambo, and Cathedra are surrounded by a border of Bianco Carrara C marble with Giallo Siena diamond accents.

The Tabernacle was conceived as a miniature, idealized cathedral, and was constructed entirely in marble. It features details such as a lapis lazuli and mother-of-pearl roundel, which represents the rose window, as well as a gold door. The tabernacle stands on a highly elevated platform within the apse. The design of the apse is informed by a scripture passage found in Revelation 4:2-7, which provides a description of Heaven as the Lamb joined by four creatures, 24 elders in white robes with golden crowns, and seven lamps.

See also
List of Catholic cathedrals in the United States
List of cathedrals in the United States

References

External links

Cathedral website
Diocese of Raleigh website

2017 establishments in North Carolina
Bell towers in the United States
Carillons
Church buildings with domes
Roman Catholic cathedrals in North Carolina
Roman Catholic churches completed in 2017
Roman Catholic churches in Raleigh, North Carolina
Roman Catholic Diocese of Raleigh
Romanesque Revival architecture in North Carolina
New Classical architecture